Obelus despreauxii is a European species of small air-breathing land snail, a terrestrial pulmonate gastropod mollusk in the family Geomitridae. 

This species is endemic to Canary Islands.

References

 Bank, R. A.; Neubert, E. (2017). Checklist of the land and freshwater Gastropoda of Europe. Last update: July 16th, 2017

Obelus (gastropod)
Molluscs of the Canary Islands
Endemic fauna of the Canary Islands
Gastropods described in 1839
Taxonomy articles created by Polbot